Vladimir Popović  (born April 4, 1982) is a Serbian former professional basketball player.

References

External links
 Vladimir Popovic

1982 births
Living people
Basketball League of Serbia players
KK Tamiš players
OKK Beograd players
KK Sloga players
KK Mega Basket players
KK Lions/Swisslion Vršac players
Serbian expatriate basketball people in Slovenia
Serbian expatriate basketball people in North Macedonia
Serbian men's basketball players
Sportspeople from Valjevo
Guards (basketball)